New Hampshire is a census-designated place in central Goshen Township, Auglaize County, Ohio, United States. As of the 2010 census, it had a population of 174.

Located between Wapakoneta and Lakeview at the intersection of U.S. Route 33 with State Routes 196 and 385, the village maintains a small post office (Zip Code: 45870) and a country store.

History
New Hampshire was laid out in 1836. The community was named after the state of New Hampshire. A post office called New Hampshire has been in operation since 1855.

Education
The community is served by the Waynesfield-Goshen Local School District.

References

Census-designated places in Ohio
Census-designated places in Auglaize County, Ohio
1836 establishments in Ohio
Populated places established in 1836